Conus balabacensis is a species of sea snail, a marine gastropod mollusc in the family Conidae, the cone snails, cone shells or cones.

These snails are predatory and venomous. They are capable of "stinging" humans.

Description
The size of the shell varies between 15 mm and 29 mm.

Distribution
This marine species  occurs off Sabah, Malaysia and Palawan, Philippines

References

 Filmer R.M. (2012) Taxonomic review of the Conus spectrum, Conus stramineus and Conus collisus complexes (Gastropoda - Conidae). Part III: The Conus collisus complex. Visaya 3(6): 4-47
 Puillandre N., Duda T.F., Meyer C., Olivera B.M. & Bouchet P. (2015). One, four or 100 genera? A new classification of the cone snails. Journal of Molluscan Studies. 81: 1-23

External links
 To World Register of Marine Species
 Cone Shells - Knights of the Sea
 

balabacensis
Invertebrates of Malaysia
Molluscs of the Philippines
Gastropods described in 2012